Dahlia Salem (born November 21, 1971) is an American actress. She played Sofia Carlino on Another World and Claire Walsh on General Hospital. At the age of six, she was already impersonating family and friends at gatherings.  After enrolling in Boston University, Salem began exploring her interest in acting by performing in several college productions including Othello and Biloxi Blues, and earned a nomination for The Irene Ryan Award for her portrayal of Helena in R.U.R.
After earning her bachelor's degree, Salem was accepted to the Circle in the Square Theater Conservatory program in New York City, where she studied for two years.  Among her noteworthy stage performances are a staged reading of the classic Strindberg play The Father, opposite Al Pacino, and her Broadway debut as the understudy for the role of Rosa in the Broadway production of Tennessee Williams' classic, The Rose Tattoo, opposite Mercedes Ruehl and Anthony LaPaglia.

Upon completing the Conservatory program, Salem signed on with an agent and landed the role of the sassy and passionate Sofia Carlino on the NBC daytime drama Another World.  After three years as Sofia, Salem decided to pursue a career in primetime television and film, and before long, she made guest star appearances on NBC's Third Watch and CBS' Now and Again.  Her other television credits include the WB pilot Sullivan Street, Fox Family Channel's The Fearing Mind, and the upcoming Disney film Newport South (executive produced by John Hughes).

Not long after wrapping production on Return to Cabin by the Lake, Salem landed a guest starring role in Dope, a new pilot for the FX network featuring Jason Priestley.

Personal life
Salem lives in Los Angeles with her chocolate lab, Amelie.

Filmography
 Another World (unknown episodes, 1995–98) .... Sofia Carlino
 Now and Again (2 episodes, "Fire and Ice" and "Disco Inferno", 2000) .... Woman / Miss Avalona
 Third Watch (1 episode, "Journey to the Himalayas", 2000) .... Sheila
 Return to Cabin by the Lake (2001) (TV) .... Alison Gaddis
 New Port South (2001) .... Kameron
 The Agency (1 episode, "The Enemy Within", 2002) ....
 Sex, Politics & Cocktails (2002) (assistant director) (uncredited)
 Alaska (2003) (TV) .... Allison Harper
 CSI: Crime Scene Investigation (1 episode, "Crash and Burn", 2003) .... Elaine Alcott
 Threat Matrix (1 episode, "Veteran's Day", 2003) .... DEA Agent Maria Cruz
 Peacemakers (1 episode, "A Town Without Pity", 2003) .... Sabrina Hamilton
 JAG (1 episode, "The Boast", 2003) .... Ginny Serrano
 Eyes (1 episode, "Shots", 2005) .... Elisa Cruz
 The King of Queens (1 episode, "Sandwiched Out", 2005) .... Waitress
 House (1 episode, "Sleeping Dogs Lie", 2006) .... Max
 CSI: Miami (1 episode, "One of Our Own", 2006) .... FBI Agent Heather Landrey
 ER (7 episodes, 2005–06) .... Dr. Jessica Albright
 Criminal Minds (1 episode, "Aftermath", 2006) .... Maggie Callahan
 Her Sister's Keeper (2006) (TV) .... Kate Brennan
 Justice (2 episodes, "Shotgun" and "Christmas Party", 2006) .... DA then DDA Susan Hale
 The Nines (2007) .... Herself
 Army Wives (1 episode, "Nobody's Perfect", 2007) .... Belinda Greer
 Paul Blart: Mall Cop (2009) .... Mother
 Medium (1 episode, "All in the Family", 2009) .... Harmony Fletcher
 Love Finds a Home (2009) (TV) .... Mabel Mcqueen
 Castle (1 episode, "The Fifth Bullet", 2009) .... Tory Westchester
 The Forgotten (1 episode, "Patient John", 2010) .... Dr. Mallory Messenger
 In Plain Sight (TV Series)  "Love in the Time of Colorado" (2011) …. Winnie Kirsh
 General Hospital (96 episodes, 2010) .... Claire Walsh
 Cut! (2014) .... Chloe Joe
 CSI: Cyber (1 episode, "Click Your Poison", 2015) .... Jane Bruno
 NCIS (2003-ongoing) (1 episode, “Decompressed”, 2016) as Maria De La Rosa

References

External links
 

1971 births
American television actresses
Living people
Actresses from New York City
Actresses from Los Angeles
21st-century American women